Stefan Angelov (7 January 1947 – 21 December 2019) was a Bulgarian wrestler who competed in the 1972 Summer Olympics and in the 1976 Summer Olympics.

References

External links
 

1947 births
2019 deaths
Olympic wrestlers of Bulgaria
Wrestlers at the 1972 Summer Olympics
Wrestlers at the 1976 Summer Olympics
Bulgarian male sport wrestlers
Olympic bronze medalists for Bulgaria
Olympic medalists in wrestling
Medalists at the 1972 Summer Olympics
Medalists at the 1976 Summer Olympics